Miloš Živković (Serbian Cyrillic: Милош Живковић; born 24 May 1984) is a professional association football player.

External links
 
 

1984 births
Living people
People from Ćuprija
Association football midfielders
Serbian footballers
FK Radnički 1923 players
FK Bežanija players
OFK Mladenovac players
FK Jagodina players
FK Mladi Radnik players
Serbian SuperLiga players